Eli, Eli may refer to:

"Eli, Eli" (my God, my God ), opening words of  My God, my God, why hast Thou forsaken me
"Eli, Eli, lama sabachthani", a phrase spoken by Jesus on the cross, according to Matthew and Mark, taken from Psalm 22
 "Eli, Eli", a song based on the 1942 poem "A Walk to Caesarea" by Hungarian Jewish resistance fighter Hannah Szenes

See also
Eli Eli Lama Sabachthani? (disambiguation)
Eli (disambiguation)
El (deity)
El (disambiguation)

Hebrew words and phrases in the Hebrew Bible